Israr Ahmed (1932–2010) was a Pakistani Islamic theologian, philosopher and Islamic scholar.

Israr Ahmed may also refer to:

 Israr Ahmed (squash player) (born 1997), Pakistani professional squash player
 Israr Ahmed (cricketer) (born 1999), Pakistani cricketer
 Israr Ahmad (1940–2010), Indian theoretical nuclear physicist

Pakistani masculine given names